Shanghai Young Bakers (SYB) is a nonprofit program based in Shanghai, China providing a fully sponsored training in French and Chinese bakery and pastry to disadvantaged Chinese youth from 17 to 23 years of age. The goal is to allow them to find qualified jobs in the bakery-pastry making sector and lead an independent life after graduation.

History 
Shanghai Young Bakers was initiated in 2008 as a social innovation project by the French Junior Economic Chamber of Shanghai.

A group of 12 French people, who had been living in China for a few years, wished to contribute a meaningful project to the country that had welcomed them. Inspired by a social bakery La Boulangerie Française in Huế, Vietnam,  they discovered that there was a high demand for French bakery in China as well, due to the rapid growth of bakeries and 4/5 stars hotels. Given the lack of a high-quality French bakery training in China at that time, SYB was created in order to equip the underprivileged with a skill that was needed on the job market.

The project was officially launched in February 2009 with the first batch of 16 students. Initially six-months long, the training now lasts one year.

Since 2021, the project was handed over to Shanghai Ruifeng welfare center. Today, Jiajia Wang, the Executive Director of SYB and President of Ruifeng Welfare Center, collaborate with other staff, interns and volunteers of different nationalities to build a fully-sponsored vocational training program in French bakery for marginalized Chinese youth.

Social Mission 
Inspired by the Chinese proverb, SYB's motto is "Give an orphan some bread, you feed him for one day; teach him how to bake, you feed him for a lifetime!" With that in mind, SYB program puts a greater emphasis on equipping its trainees with skills rather than simply providing them with knowledge.

SYB's mission can be highlighted in three key words:

 Charity: Enable disadvantaged youth to lead independent lives through a qualified, empowering job 
SYB recruits students who formerly had no viable employment options, offers the training for free and targets 100% successful employment in bakery after graduation. Chi Heng Foundation, its governing body, guarantees the social mission of the SYB training program.
 Expertise: Become a leading reference in French traditional bakery training in China 
SYB works with the Ecole Francaise de Boulangerie et Pâtisserie d’Aurillac (EFBPA), qualified bakery professionals and local authorities to ensure a high-quality training that will eventually be officially and widely recognised throughout China.
 Sustainability: Achieve financial autonomy through a social enterprise model
The baking and pastry classes are given by SYB graduates educated at EFBPA in France, which forms a "giving back" cycle to support SYB sustainable development in return. SYB Baking Center and teaching resources allow more commercial activities to take place so that the generated revenue can support the training program, complement donations and alleviate financial burdens.

Recruitment and Training 

SYB students, who come from all over China, undergo a year of intense vocational training. Shanghai Young Bakers cooperates with a network of local and international partner NGOs which recommend students based on their financial background and motivation to pursue a career in bakery. The program accepts up to 32 students per year to ensure that a high-quality training is provided.

The SYB program is based on learning and working alternation system with two weeks of bakery/pastry class and two weeks of interning at international hotels. It is based on the French professional diploma Certificat d'aptitude professionnelle (CAP), as developed by the Ecole Française de Boulangerie et Patisserie d’Aurillac. Given that, the curriculum and exams are designed under the supervision of EFBPA.

The students also learn how to make Chinese-style breads and pastries, a curriculum that is taught at the Shanghai Caoyang Vocational School. Within the one-year program, students attain both basic and intermediate levels of the official Western Bakery diploma, awarded by the Shanghai Labor Bureau and recognized throughout China. The training also includes theory classes covering topics such as ingredients composition and nutrition, food quality and safety and workplace hygiene.

In addition to that, SYB offers its students English and life skills classes which are vital to further the graduates' career development opportunities.

Social enterprise 

Since 2011, the program has created a social enterprise that offers a range of commercial services whose proceeds go to the charity program. Among the services available are catering, teambuilding activities, public baking and pastry classes, DIY workshops for kids, and consulting services for F&B professionals.

References

 "All Rise - Shanghai Young Bakers", Talk Magazine, Shanghai,  April 2012.
 Black, Kat. "Sweet success: the story of Shanghai’s Young Bakers Program", Xuhui News, Shanghai, 30 December 2013.
 Pornet, Alisée. "A Shanghaï, le pain quotidien d’apprenties boulangères", Le Monde, 15 November 2013.
 "Shanghai Young Bakers: The Bakery Helping Disadvantaged Youth", City Weekend, 26 November 2012.

External links 
 Official site

Organizations based in Shanghai
Educational organizations based in China
Baking industry